A total lunar eclipse took place on Friday, March 24, 1978, the first of two total lunar eclipses in 1978. The moon passed through the center of the Earth's shadow. The Moon was plunged into darkness for 1 hour, 30 minutes and 40.2 seconds, in a deep total eclipse which saw the Moon 45.179% of its diameter inside the Earth's umbral shadow. The visual effect of this depends on the state of the Earth's atmosphere, but the Moon may have been stained a deep red colour. The partial eclipse lasted for 3 hours, 38 minutes and 34.5 seconds in total.

This is the 54th member of Lunar Saros 122. The previous event is the March 1960 lunar eclipse. The next event is the April 1996 lunar eclipse.

Visibility 
It was seen completely over Asia and Australia, and rising over Africa and Europe. It was seen setting over Pacific Ocean on the morning of Friday 24 March, 1978.

Related lunar eclipses

Eclipses in 1978 
 A total lunar eclipse on Friday, 24 March 1978.
 A partial solar eclipse on Friday, 7 April 1978.
 A total lunar eclipse on Saturday, 16 September 1978.
 A partial solar eclipse on Monday, 2 October 1978.

Lunar year series

Tritos series

Half-Saros cycle
A lunar eclipse will be preceded and followed by solar eclipses by 9 years and 5.5 days (a half saros). This lunar eclipse is related to two solar eclipses of Solar Saros 129.

See also 
List of lunar eclipses
List of 20th-century lunar eclipses

Notes

External links 
 

1978-03
1978-03
1978 in science
March 1978 events